Tetyana Antypenko (née Zavalij, born September 24, 1981) is a Ukrainian cross country skier who has competed since 2000. She participated at 2006, 2010, 2014 Winter Olympics.

Career
Tetiana Zavaliy was born in a small town Uhroidy, Sumy Oblast, where she took up skiing in the third form of elementary schools, since it was the only one sport section in the town.

At the FIS Cross-Country World Cup she debuted on February 14, 2004. Later she qualified for 2006 Winter Olympics. Her best personal result was 27th in 10 km classical race. She competed at 2005 World Championships which was for her the only one in the career until 2013.

On February 26, 2009, he won a silver medal in women's relay at 2009 Winter Universiade in Harbin, China.

Zavaliy competed at the 2010 Winter Olympics in Vancouver. There her best personal result was 21st in 30 km classical mass start race.

She made a pause in competitions in 2011–2012. She married and changed her surname to Antypenko. Under this surname she competed at two World championships and two Winter Olympics.

As of February 2018, her best World Cup finish was 14th in skiathlon in Russian Sochi on February 2, 2013. That was also the first season she earned some World Cup points.

Career results

Winter Olympics

World Championships

World Cup

References

External links
 
 
 
 

1981 births
Cross-country skiers at the 2006 Winter Olympics
Cross-country skiers at the 2010 Winter Olympics
Cross-country skiers at the 2014 Winter Olympics
Cross-country skiers at the 2018 Winter Olympics
Living people
Olympic cross-country skiers of Ukraine
Ukrainian female cross-country skiers
Universiade silver medalists for Ukraine
Universiade medalists in cross-country skiing
Competitors at the 2009 Winter Universiade
Sportspeople from Sumy Oblast
21st-century Ukrainian women